The Krumm House is a historic building in the Brewery District neighborhood of Columbus, Ohio. It was listed on the National Register of Historic Places and Columbus Register of Historic Properties in 1982. The brick house was built c. 1885. The building was home to Alexander W. Krumm, the Columbus City Solicitor from 1878 to 1883. The property is also one of few remaining late 19th century houses on South High Street.

See also
 National Register of Historic Places listings in Columbus, Ohio

References

Houses on the National Register of Historic Places in Ohio
Italianate architecture in Ohio
Houses completed in 1885
Houses in Columbus, Ohio
National Register of Historic Places in Columbus, Ohio
Columbus Register properties
High Street (Columbus, Ohio)
Historic district contributing properties in Columbus, Ohio